Ana James (born 1976) is a New Zealand-born operatic soprano who has appeared with The Royal Opera, the Glyndebourne touring ensemble, and Opera Holland Park as well as with opera companies in France and New Zealand.

Life and career

James was born in Dunedin, New Zealand and trained at the Manhattan School of Music and the Royal College of Music's Benjamin Britten International Opera School. In 2004 she   was the inaugural recipient of the Kiri Te Kanawa Foundation Award, which supports young operatic artists at the start of their careers. From 2005 to 2007 she was a member of the Jette Parker Young Artists programme at the Royal Opera House.

While a member of the Jette Parker programme, her appearances with the Royal Opera included Barbarina in David McVicar's production of The Marriage of Figaro and Serpina in La serva padrona. Her performance in The Marriage of Figaro at the Royal Opera House is preserved in the 2006 live recording released on DVD by Opus Arte. After leaving the programme, her performances with other opera companies have included Pamina in The Magic Flute with the Glyndebourne touring company (2008), Gretel in Hansel and Gretel with New Zealand Opera (2008), Donna Anna in Don Giovanni with Opera Holland Park (2010), and Miss Wordsworth in Albert Herring at the Théâtre du Capitole in Toulouse (2013). In 2013 she also sang Konstanze in a concert version of Die Entführung aus dem Serail in the Theatro Municipal in Rio de Janeiro with the Brazilian Symphony Orchestra under Alejo Pérez.

Ana James sang Ygraine in a 2007 recording of Ariane et Barbe-bleue with the BBC Symphony Orchestra conducted by Leon Botstein. In a 2012 live recording of I quatro rusteghi she sang Felice with the Royal Liverpool Philharmonic Orchestra conducted by Vasily Petrenko. In the 2013 live recording of Parsifal at the Proms, she sang a flower maiden with the Hallé Orchestra conducted by Mark Elder.

Discography
 2006: The Marriage of Figaro, Orchestra and Chorus of the Royal Opera House conducted by Antonio Pappano (Opus Arte, OABD7033D)
 2007: Ariane et Barbe-bleue, BBC Symphony Orchestra conducted by Leon Botstein.(Telarc, CD80680)
 2013: Parsifal, Hallé Orchestra conducted by Mark Elder. (Hallé, CDHLD7539)
 2018: I quatro rusteghi, Royal Liverpool Philharmonic Orchestra conducted by Vasily Petrenko. (Rubicon, RCD1024)

References

External links
Biography on IMG Artists

1976 births
Living people
21st-century New Zealand women opera singers
New Zealand operatic sopranos
Musicians from Dunedin
New Zealand expatriates in England